Belekeri is a village in Ankola, Karnataka, India, and is known for its fish.  It is approximately 6 km from Ankola. Its industrial port is used for shipping iron ore and manganese to various destinations, including China.The port came to a wide media attention due to the Belekeri port scam.

History 
Historically, the port was used by the British. The village has ancient historical significance as it houses an inscription which is more than 500 years old. It has Jainabeera temple, which is of a great significance to the villagers.

Belekeri Port  
The port is suitable for moderate weathers. If proper improvements are brought about, it can greatly increase its capacity. Government of Karnataka has planned to improve it under Public-Private partnership. Justice Santosh Hegde, the then Lokayukta of Karnataka, is also reported to have expressed his concerns over the illegal activities.

Environmental issues 
The export activity caused sufferings to over 3500 people. Fishermen have also expressed concerns over damages to their fishing activities. But, pressures to start the mining and ore-exporting are on the rise in Karnataka.

Beach 
Grassy lawns are a common sight. The sunsets are pleasing to the eyes. The place also has  hills around. The beach is not far away from other tourist attractions like Gokarna. The nearest  railway station to Belekeri is the Ankola railway station, which is about 11 km away.

See also 
 Mangalore
 Ankola
 New Mangalore Port

References 

Villages in Uttara Kannada district